The Institut des Sciences et Techniques des Yvelines or ISTY is a French public engineering school specialized in the field of computer science and mechatronics, attached to the Versailles Saint-Quentin-en-Yvelines University.

References

External links 
 

Grandes écoles
Educational institutions established in 1992
Versailles Saint-Quentin-en-Yvelines University
1992 establishments in France